Westland University, Iwo, is a private institution based in Iwo, Osun State, Nigeria.

History 
The institution was established in 1984, by Dr Eng. Wole Adepoju as Cedaespring Technical Institute before becoming a full-fledged university in 2019. Westland University was granted a provisional license by the Federal Executive Council to commenced academic programmes in 2019.

Programmes 
The National University Commission, NUC, have accredited and approved over 20 programmes at university.

Faculty of Social and Management Sciences
 BSc Accounting
 BSc Economics
 BSc Business Administration
 BSc Banking & Finance
 BSc Political Science
 BSc Mass Communication
 BSc International Relations

Faculty of Basic Science and Computing
BSc Mathematics
BSc Computer Science
BSc Geology
BSc Software Engineering
BSc Physics with Electronics
BSc Chemistry

Faculty of Mass & Media, Communication/Library and Information Science  
BSc Journalism and Media Studies
BSc Publishing and Copyright Studies
BSc Library and Information Science
BSc Bibliotherapy Science
BSc Advertising and Multimedia Studies
BSc Public Relation and Public Speech Making

References 

Westland University, Iwo
Educational institutions established in 1984
Osun State
Private universities and colleges in Nigeria
1984 establishments in Nigeria